Virginia Wade defeated the defending champion Billie Jean King in the final, 6–4, 6–2 to win the women's singles tennis title at the 1968 US Open. It was her first major title.

This was the first edition of the tournament to be open to amateurs and professionals, marking a period known as the Open Era.

Seeds
The seeded players are listed below. Virginia Wade is the champion; others show the round in which they were eliminated.

 Billie Jean King (Runner-up)
 Ann Jones (semifinals)
 Judy Tegart (quarterfinals)
 Margaret Court (quarterfinals)
 Maria Bueno (semifinals)
 Virginia Wade (champion)
 Mary-Ann Eisel (first round)
 Kristy Pigeon (second round)

Draw

Key
 Q = Qualifier
 WC = Wild card
 LL = Lucky loser
 r = Retired

Finals

Earlier rounds

Section 1

Section 2

Section 3

Section 4

External links
1968 US Open – Women's draws and results at the International Tennis Federation

US Open (tennis) by year – Women's singles
Women's Singles
US Open – Women's Singles
US Open – Women's Singles